{
  "type": "FeatureCollection",
  "features": [
    {
      "type": "Feature",
      "properties": {},
      "geometry": {
        "type": "Point",
        "coordinates": [
          85.95703125000001,
          26.85592981510499
        ]
      }
    }
  ]
}Mahendranagar is a town in Chhireshwarnath Municipality of Dhanusa District in the Janakpur Zone of south-eastern Nepal. The formerly Village Development Committee was converted into municipality merging along with existing VDCs Ramdaiya, Sakhuwa Mahendranagar, Hariharpur and Digambarpur on 18 May 2014. At the time of the 1991 Nepal census it had a population of 10,209 persons living in 1916 individual households. Mahendranagar acts as bridge between Dhalkebar and Janakpur. Basically it is popular for its largest cattle market in the Nepal. It is assumed that 65% of cattle for e.g. buffalo, goats in Kathmandu valley are brought from here. The town is named after late king Mahendra.

Banks and financial institutions

Mahendranagar has branches of commercial banks and Co-operative Organization. 
 Kumari Bank Limited
 Rastriya Banijya Bank Limited
 Sahayogi Bikash Bank Limited
 Machhapuchchhre Bank
 Century Bank Limited
Prabhu Bank
NIC Asia Bank

Many Co-operative organization are based in  Mahendranagar. Mahalakshi, Laxman rekha, Khusiyali, jaiSi baba, Upyogi Co-operative organization provide Loan and Saving Facilities. They concentrate loan to poor people without any deposit.

Education
Different private schools are opened here for quality education. Most of them are residential English and Nepali medium schools. D R S K  Secondary English Boarding, Saraswati English Boarding School. Gangotri Secondary English Boarding School, New Parijat Educational Academy, Gyan Mandir Boarding, D.R.S.K Academy and Pragati Shishu Sadan are  also famous school of Chhireswor Municipality. Chhireswor Janta Higher Secondary School is the oldest Educational institute of Chhireshwor Municipality. Here is also Government School, which provides free education facilities. This school also Provide Dress to all the Students.

There are two Colleges in Chhireswornath Municipality. Chhireswor Janta Bahumukhi Campus is the oldest campus of chhireswarnath Municipality. Gangotri Campus is another Campus at Chhireswornath Municipality which is recently commenced.

Agrochemical Suppliers

Durga Beej Bhandar

Durga Beej Bhandar (Nepali: दुर्गा बीज भण्डार) is a well-known agrochemical supplier in Nepal since 1993. It is retail as well as wholesale. It provides insecticides, fungicides, herbicides, pesticides, and many other chemicals that are used for the treatment of crops. Seeds are the most essential component of agriculture. It also provides seasonal as well as hybrid seeds.

The primary business purpose of Durga Beej Bhandar is bringing quality products from India, China & from other countries and distribute the equivalent products in different parts of Nepal through legitimate channels. Durga Beej Bhandar has created numerous business sectors in Nepal through appropriate gatherings and Demo office through field staffs and organizing with Horticulture officers among the domain. It has more than 100 sole distributors all over Nepal.{
  "type": "FeatureCollection",
  "features": [
    {
      "type": "Feature",
      "properties": {},
      "geometry": {
        "type": "Point",
        "coordinates": [
          85.96367937336255,
          26.866326096518293
        ]
      }
    }
  ]
}

Industries

Tej Cement Factory

The only cement factory in Mahendranagar, Dhanusha, Nepal. It was established in 2000.

Everest Paper Industry
The only Paper Mill in Sakhuwa Mahendranagar, Dhanusha, Nepal.

Ram Janki Dalmoth Udhyog
The only Dalmoth Factory in Mahendranagar.

Entertainment
Luv Kush Cinema Hall

The only movie threater in Chhireswarnath municipality. Periodically stage shows, concerts and plays are occasionally organized by the local clubs and organizations. People here enjoys a lot during some festivals like Holi, Tihar, Deepawali, Dashain, etc.

Geography and climate 

Chhireswarnath is located in the Terai, forested and marshy terrain at the base of the Himalaya mountain range. The major rivers surrounding are Aurahi, Jalad. Chhireswarnath Municipality is famous for its temples (Shiv temple).

One can see all the six seasons in Chhireswarnath. Basant ritu (Spring - February/March), Grisma ritu (Summer - April/May/June), Barsha ritu (Rainy - July/August), Sharad ritu (Autumn - September/October), Hemanta ritu (Autumn-winter - November/December), Shishir ritu (Winter - December/January).

The best time to visit in Chhireswar is from September to March as the weather is pleasant and several festivals fall during this period.

Hotels
Chhireswornath has several hotels and restaurants which offer food and accommodation. These include Hotel Royal, Chaudhary Hotel, Sah Meat house,  Hotel Namaste.
There are also several cheaper lodges and Dharamsala (free accommodations) for pilgrims.

Social Organization
Dhanusha Kabadi Kho-Kho Academy: One of the sport organization  in the city and Covering the small area of Mahendranagar.
Dhudmati Mai Yuwa Samti: Helping the Young generation in the field of Sports and religion. The club organise the program like Chhath Puja, Jitmahan Mela, Cricket Tournament etc. The club also organises the programs related to environment cleaning, health program for the dudhamatti. The  head of the organization is Mr.Shyam Patel.

CLEAN DUDHMATI GREEN DUDHMATI : Helping the Young generation in the field of Sports and religion. The club organise the program like Chhath Puja, Jitmahan Mela, Cricket Tournament etc. The club also organises the programs related to environment cleaning, health program for the dudhamatti. And also performing Cleaning of Dudhmati. In the time of Parikarma provide food and tea program . The head of the Organization is Mr.Shyam Patel.

Now the days the tender of Dudhmati is taken by Mr.Ram Shovit Mukhiya in 75,75,750 For 5 years .

References

External links
UN map of the municipalities of Dhanusa District

Populated places in Dhanusha District
Populated places in Mithila, Nepal
Towns in Nepal